Luther Burden III (born December 12, 2003) is an American football wide receiver for the Missouri Tigers.

Burden attended East St. Louis Senior High School. He was a star in both basketball and football. He was selected by ESPN as the top offensive recruit in the class of 2022 and the No. 5 overall recruit nationally. 247Sports ranked him as the No. 3 recruit in the nation, and Rivals.com rated him at No. 4.

Burden received 41 total college scholarship offers, eventually narrowing his final options  to Alabama, Georgia, and Missouri. In October 2021, he committed to Missouri. He was only the third consensus five-star recruit signed by Missouri in the past 20 years, after Dorial Green-Beckham and Blaine Gabbert.

Burden made his collegiate debut on September 1, 2022, catching three passes for 17 yards and had two touchdowns. Through games of November 5, 2022, he tallied 30 receptions for 245 yards and two touchdowns.

References

External links
 Missouri bio

Living people
American football wide receivers
Missouri Tigers football players
Players of American football from Missouri
Sportspeople from St. Louis
2003 births